Mga Bituin ng Kinabukasan (lit. "The Stars of Tomorrow") is a 1952 Philippine drama film. It is a story about orphaned children who seek the love of parents. Directed by José Nepomuceno, it stars Ike Lozada and Susan Roces in her first film, where she played an 11-year-old orphan girl.

External links

1952 films
Philippine black-and-white films
Tagalog-language films
Films about orphans
Philippine drama films
Philippine comedy-drama films
1952 comedy-drama films